Anne Louyot is a French diplomat who currently serves as Ambassador Extraordinary and Plenipotentiary of France to Armenia.

Biography 
Before her career in Armenia, Anne Louyot worked in French consular missions in Spain, Colombia and Brazil. She was appointed Ambassador of France to Armenia in August 2021, replacing her predecessor Jonathan Lacôte. In September she presented her credentials to Foreign Minister of Armenia Ararat Mirzoyan and President of Armenia Armen Sargsyan. In her interview to CivilNet she stated her mission as "standing side by side with Armenia looking into its future".

References 

Living people
21st-century French diplomats
Ambassadors of France to Armenia
Year of birth missing (living people)